WIMN may be:

 WIMN-CD, a religious, class A digital television station located in Arecibo, Puerto Rico
 WiMN - Women’s International Music Network
 WIMN - Sisingamangaraja XII International Airport
 WIMN-FM
 WIMN-AM